Desir or Désir may refer to:

People
 Christie Desir (born 1993), Haitian-American beauty queen, model and actress
 Harlem Désir, French politician
 Jean-Claude Désir (born 1946), Haitian football player
 Pierre Desir (born 1990), American American football cornerback

Places
 Saint-Désir, France

Other
 Désir, song by Garnidelia